David Rosenbaum may refer to:

 David Rosenbaum (journalist) (1942–2006), American journalist
 David Rosenbaum (soccer) (born 1986), American soccer player